The Brooklyn Times-Union was an American newspaper published from 1848 to 1937. Launched in 1848 as the Williamsburgh Daily Times, the publication became the  Brooklyn Daily Times when the cities of Brooklyn and Williamsburg were unified in 1855. The newspaper supported the then-progressive Republican Party, and the Abolition movement. Walt Whitman was one of their reporters, and was later the managing editor after he left the Brooklyn Daily Eagle.

The paper was published both daily and on Sunday, and had a peak circulation that included all of Kings County, and large segments of Nassau and Suffolk Counties. As the Brooklyn Daily Times, the paper was published in various editions, including the Long Island, Wall Street, and Noon editions.

The Daily Times was renamed the Brooklyn Times-Union after it bought out the Brooklyn Standard Union in 1932, and was itself bought out by the Brooklyn Eagle in 1937.

Brooklyn's Times Plaza at the intersections of Flatbush Avenue; Atlantic Avenue, Fourth Avenue, Ashland Place, State Street, and Hanson Place was named for this newspaper.

References

Defunct newspapers published in New York City
1848 establishments in New York (state)
1937 disestablishments in New York (state)
Publications established in 1848
Publications disestablished in 1937
Newspapers published in Brooklyn
Daily newspapers published in New York City